The Ministry of Minority Affairs is the ministry in the Government of India which was carved out of the Ministry of Social Justice and Empowerment and created on 29 January 2006. It is the apex body for the central government's regulatory and developmental programmes for the minority religious communities and minority linguistic communities in India, which include Muslims, Sikhs, Christians, Buddhists, Zoroastrians (Parsis) and Jains notified as minority religious communities in The Gazette of India under Section 2(c) of the National Commission for Minorities Act, 1992.

Mukhtar Abbas Naqvi assumed the office as a cabinet minister for Minority Affairs on 4 September 2017. He served as the Minister of State for Minority Affairs when Najma Heptulla was the cabinet minister. Following Najma Heptulla's resignation on 12 July 2016, Naqvi was assigned the Independent charge of the Ministry.

The ministry is also involved with the linguistic minorities and of the office of the Commissioner for Linguistic Minorities, representation of the Anglo-Indian community, protection and preservation of non-Muslim shrines in Pakistan and Muslim shrines in India in terms of the Pant-Mirza Agreement of 1955, in consultation with the Ministry of External Affairs. The Minister in charge is also Chairperson of the Central Wakf Council, India, which manages the running of the State Wakf Boards. Ministry of Minority Affairs provides Moma scholarship to minority community students of India every year. Moma Scholarship is a scholarship scheme of the Ministry of Minority Affairs initiated with the aim of supporting minority communities student who is not financially strong and wants to pursue higher studies in India. Minority communities in India includes Muslims, Sikhs, Christians, Buddhists, Parsis and Jains. The scholarship is awarded to the students by India Government through State Government/UTs. The scholarship is awarded for the undergraduate and postgraduate courses.

Linguistic Minorities, according to Indian Constitution should have a Special Officer appointed.

Constitutional Article:  350B. 
There shall be a Special Officer for linguistic minorities to be appointed by the President.
It shall be the duty of the Special Officer to investigate all matters relating to the safeguards provided for linguistic minorities under this Constitution and report to the President upon those matters at such intervals as the President may direct, and the President shall cause all such reports to be laid before each House of Parliament, and sent to the Governments of the States concerned.

It is to be decided based on states as the states have been formed on linguistic basis.

Ministers
The Minister of Minority Affairs is the head of the Ministry of Minority Affairs and one of the cabinet ministers of the Government of India.

List of Ministers of State

Organisations

Constitutional and Statutory Bodies
 Central Wakf Council (CWC)
 National Commission for Minorities (NCM) 
 Commissioner for Linguistic Minorities (CLM)
 Autonomous Bodies
 Maulana Azad Education Foundation (MAEF)
 PSUs and Joint Ventures
 National Minorities Development and Finance Corporation (NMDFC)

Schemes & Scholarship Programmes
 Jiyo Parsi - Scheme for containing population decline of Parsis
 Nai Roshni - Scheme for Leadership Development of Minority Women
 Nai Manzil - An Integrated Education and Livelihood Initiative for the Minority Communities
 Nai Udaan -  Support for minority students clearing prelims exam conducted by UPSC, State PSC and SSC
 Seekho aur Kamao (Learn & Earn) - Scheme for Skill Development of Minorities
 Hamari Dharohar - A scheme to preserve the rich heritage of Minority Communities of India under the overall concept of Indian culture
 Pre-Matric Scholarship Scheme
 Post-Matric Scholarship Scheme
 Merit-cum-Means Scholarship Scheme
 Maulana Azad National Fellowship for Minority Students
Padho Pardesh - Scheme of Interest Subsidy on Educational Loans for Overseas Studies for the Students Belonging to the Minority Communities

References

External links
Ministry of Minority Affairs, Official Website
Current Affairs News and Magazines

Ministry of Minority Affairs
Minority Affairs
Religion in India
2006 establishments in India
India, Minority Affairs
India, Minority Affairs
India, Minority Affairs
Minorities-focussed government initiatives in India